The 2005 Tour de France was the 92nd edition of the Tour de France, one of cycling's Grand Tours. It took place between 2–24 July, with 21 stages covering a distance . It has no overall winner—although American cyclist Lance Armstrong originally won the event, the United States Anti-Doping Agency announced on 24 August 2012 that they had disqualified Armstrong from all his results since 1 August 1998, including his seven Tour de France wins from 1999 to 2005. The verdict  was subsequently confirmed by the UCI.

The first stages were held in the département of the Vendée, for the third time in 12 years. The 2005 Tour was announced on 28 October 2004. It was a clockwise route, visiting the Alps before the Pyrenees. Armstrong took the top step on the podium, for what was then the seventh consecutive time. He was accompanied on the podium by Ivan Basso and Jan Ullrich, but in 2012 Ullrich's results were annulled. The points classification was won by Thor Hushovd, and the mountains classification by Michael Rasmussen.

The race was seen by 15 million spectators along the road, and by 2 billion viewers on TV.

Teams

In 2005, the UCI had started the ProTour: 20 teams were given a ProTour licence, and were required to start in all ProTour races, which included the Tour de France. The Tour de France organisation was not happy with this rule, as they wanted to be able to decide which teams would join their race. While negotiations were still ongoing, it was decided to use the UCI rule for the 2005 Tour, so all 20 ProTour teams were automatically invited. The Tour organisation could invite one extra team with a wildcard, and used this to invite . All teams were composed of nine cyclists, so 189 riders in 21 teams commenced the 2005 Tour de France. Of them, 155 riders finished.

The teams entering the race were:

Pre-race favourites
The main favourite was (then) six-time winner Armstrong (now stripped of all his victories). Armstrong had had doubts if he should start the 2005 Tour, but decided in February 2005 that he would race. His main rival Ullrich was happy with this decision, as he thought it would be a better race with Armstrong present.

In previous years, Ullrich never had the full support of his team to win the general classification, as his team was also aiming for stage victories. In 2005, Erik Zabel, who had won the points classification six times, was left out of the team, and Ullrich was supported by Klöden and Vinokourov, who both had already reached the podium on the Tour.

On the day before the Tour started, Ullrich crashed into his team director's car, but was not seriously injured.

Route and stages

The Tour commemorated the death of Fabio Casartelli. During the 15th stage the riders passed the Col de Portet d'Aspet, where Casartelli died exactly 10 years earlier, in the 1995 Tour de France. The Tour also commemorated the first time there was an official mountain climb in the Tour, the Ballon d'Alsace. During the 9th stage this mountain was passed again, exactly 100 years after the first ascent in the Tour.

The 2005 Tour de France was divided into 21 stages. These stages belong to different categories: 8 were flat stages, 5 were medium mountain stages, 5 were high mountain stages, 2 were individual time trials and 1 was a team time trial. The distinction between flat stage, medium mountain stage and high mountain stage is important for the points classification. There were two rest days, in Grenoble and in Pau.

The traditional prologue on the first day was replaced by an individual time trial of more than twice the length of a standard prologue. This stage crossed from the mainland of France to the Île de Noirmoutier. The most famous route to this island is the Passage du Gois, a road that is under water at high tide. This road was included in the 1999 Tour. Several of the favourites crashed there that year, and ended that stage 7 minutes behind the peloton. This year they took the bridge to the island. Later in the race, there was one more time trial, on the penultimate day. Also, there were just three uphill finishes (Courchevel, Ax-3 Domaines and Pla d'Adet), a lower number than in previous years. The finish line of the last stage was, as has been since 1975, on the Champs-Élysées in Paris.

In the stages that were not time trials, there were intermediate sprints. Cyclist who crossed the intermediate sprints first received points for the points classification, and bonification seconds for the general classification. Until stage 8, there were three intermediate sprints, and from stage 9 on there were two.

Race overview

In Stage 1, David Zabriskie, a former teammate of Lance Armstrong, beat Armstrong by two seconds. In the team time trial of stage 4, Zabriskie fell in the last kilometers, and Armstrong took over the lead.

Armstrong initially refused to wear the yellow jersey in the fifth stage but was forced by the Tour organisation, who threatened to remove him from the race.

In the tenth stage, the start was moved from Grenoble to Froges.

Before the 20th stage, an individual time trial, Michael Rasmussen occupied the third place in the general classification. During that stage, Rasmussen fell multiple times and changed bicycles multiple times, and lost so much time that he ended up at the seventh place in the general classification. All total throughout the stage he changed bikes twice, changed wheels twice, began to hesitate going through corners and went off the road. His final time during this ITT was still better than half the field.

The race jury invoked the 'rain rule' for the Champs-Élysées, meaning that Lance Armstrong became the winner of the General classification the first time the race passed the finish line, rather than the eighth time as normal. The time bonification for the winner of the stage was still given, and Alexander Vinokourov profited from this as he won the stage after an escape in the last kilometer (the first time since 1994 that the final stage did not end in a sprint), and passed Levi Leipheimer in the general classification to end fifth.

During the final ceremonies in Paris, Armstrong was allowed to talk to the crowds, the first time in the Tour's history that a winner was given this chance. It has since become a regular occurrence.

Doping

During the race, 143 urine tests and 21 blood tests were conducted. None of them returned positive. Still, there were fears that banned substances were being used; the boss of the  team (not racing in the 2005 Tour) questioned the increase in velocities.

In 2010, Hans Michael Holczer, the team boss of Gerolsteiner in 2005, said that the UCI had informed him that Leipheimer had shown blood values just under the doping limit, and that Holczer suspected that Leipheimer was doping. The UCI advised Gerolsteiner to find a reason to remove Leipheimer from the race, but Holczer refused, because his team was still facing bad publicity from a previous doping case.

The top five of the general classification of 2005 would not compete the 2006 edition. Armstrong had retired after the 2005 Tour, and a few days before the 2006 edition, after it became public that (among others) Basso, Ullrich and Mancebo were under investigation in the Operacion Puerto doping case, the Tour organisation and team leaders decided to exclude all cyclists under investigation from joining the Tour. Vinokourov, fifth-placed in 2005, was not under investigation, but his team was reduced to five cyclists, below the minimal required amount of six, so he could also not compete.

In February 2012, the Court of Arbitration for Sport found Ullrich guilty of being engaged in Fuentes' doping program, and decided that Ullrich's results since May 2005, including his results from the 2005 Tour de France, would be disqualified.

Subsequent to Armstrong's statement to withdraw his fight against United States Anti-Doping Agency's (USADA) charges, on 24 August 2012, the USADA said it would ban Armstrong for life and stripped him of his record seven Tour de France titles. Later that day it was confirmed in a USADA statement that Armstrong was banned for life and would be disqualified from any and all competitive results obtained on and subsequent to 1 August 1998, including forfeiture of any medals, titles, winnings, finishes, points and prizes. On 22 October 2012, the Union Cycliste Internationale endorsed the USADA sanctions, and decided not to award victories to any other rider or upgrade other placings in any of the affected events.

Michael Rasmussen, winner of the mountains classification, revealed in 2013 that in a doping test his value of immature red blood cells was below the minimum threshold, but that the UCI allowed him to continue in the race because they did not want an incident.

Classification leadership and minor prizes

There were four main individual classifications contested in the 2005 Tour de France, as well as a team competition. The most important was the general classification, which was calculated by adding each rider's finishing times on each stage, with time bonuses given at the end of each mass start stage. If a crash had happened within the final  of a stage, not including time trials and summit finishes, the riders involved would have received the same time as the group they were in when the crash occurred. The rider with the lowest cumulative time was the winner of the general classification and was considered the overall winner of the Tour. The rider leading the classification wore a yellow jersey.

The second classification was the points classification. Riders received points for finishing in the highest positions in a stage finish, or in intermediate sprints during the stage. The points available for each stage finish were determined by the stage's type. The leader was identified by a green jersey.

The third classification was the mountains classification. Most stages of the race included one or more categorised climbs, in which points were awarded to the riders that reached the summit first. The climbs were categorised as fourth-, third-, second- or first-category, or hors catégorie for the most difficult climbs. The leader wore a white jersey with red polka dots.

The final individual classification was the young rider classification. This was calculated the same way as the general classification, but the classification was restricted to riders who were born on or after 1 January 1980. The leader wore a white jersey.

The final classification was a team classification. This was calculated using the finishing times of the best three riders per team on each stage; the leading team was the team with the lowest cumulative time. The number of stage victories and placings per team determined the outcome of a tie.

In addition, there was a combativity award given after each mass start stage to the rider considered, by a jury, to have "made the greatest effort and who has demonstrated the best qualities of sportsmanship". The winner wore a red number bib the following stage. At the conclusion of the Tour, Óscar Pereiro was given the overall super-combativity award. The Souvenir Henri Desgrange given in honour of Tour founder Henri Desgrange to the first rider to pass the summit of the Col du Galibier on stage 11. This prize was won by Alexander Vinokourov.

In stage 1, Lance Armstrong wore the green jersey.

Final standings

General classification

Points classification

Mountains classification

Young rider classification

Team classification

See also
 List of doping cases in cycling

Notes

References

Bibliography

Further reading

External links

 
 2005 Tour de France at Cyclingnews.com

 
Tour de France by year
Tour de France
Tour de France
Tour de France